Coenagrion syriacum is a species of damselfly in the family Coenagrionidae. It is found in Israel, Lebanon, Syria, and Turkey. Its natural habitats are swamps, freshwater marshes, ponds, and canals and ditches. It is threatened by habitat loss.

References

Coenagrionidae
Insects described in 1924
Taxonomy articles created by Polbot